Dmitriy Kosyakov (born 28 February 1986 in Voronezh) is a Russian cyclist.

Palmares

2008
1st Stage 1 Tour de l'Avenir
2009
1st Stage 2 Circuit des Ardennes
1st Overall Tour du Loir-et-Cher
1st Stage 2
2011
1st Memorial Oleg Dyachenko
1st Stage 2 Grand Prix of Sochi
1st Stage 4 Tour of Bulgaria
2nd Mayor Cup
3rd Grand Prix of Donetsk
2012
2nd Overall Grand Prix of Sochi
3rd Grand Prix of Donetsk

References

1986 births
Living people
Russian male cyclists
Sportspeople from Voronezh